William George Burrough (22 July 1875 – 30 December 1939) played first-class cricket for Somerset in four matches in the 1906 season. He was born in Clun, Shropshire and died in Wedmore, Somerset

Burrough was the third son of the Rev Charles Burrough and his wife, who was born Georgina B. Long. He himself married Lilian Pople in 1907. She died in 1919 and he then married Dorothy Tait in 1921. He had two sons and two daughters by his first marriage. He was a partner in the law firm of Burrough and Hutton in Wedmore.

Cricket career
As a cricketer, Burrough was a fast-medium bowler and a lower-order batsman. He took four wickets in his first match, against Warwickshire at Edgbaston. But he only took three further wickets in his other three games. He batted at No 10 in each of his seven first-class innings in these four games, and had a top score of just 11.

Burrough had earlier played minor cricket for Herefordshire and for the Free Foresters amateur side.

His older brother John Burrough played first-class cricket for Cambridge University between 1893 and 1895, and William's son Dickie Burrough played 171 matches as a right-handed batsman for Somerset between 1927 and 1947. A nephew, the son of a different brother but also called John Burrough, played for Oxford University and Gloucestershire in the 1920s and 1930s.

References

1875 births
1939 deaths
English cricketers
Somerset cricketers
Herefordshire cricketers
People from Clun